Arantes may refer to:
Altino Arantes Marques (1876–1965), President of São Paulo
Altino Arantes Building, a skyscraper located in São Paulo, Brazil
Pelé (1940–2022), real name Edson Arantes do Nascimento, Brazilian footballer
Everson Arantes de Oliveira (born 1982), Brazilian footballer
Valmir Pontes Arantes (born 1981), Brazilian footballer
Guilherme Arantes (born 1953), Brazilian singer-songwriter and pianist